La Singla, also spelled La Sengla, is a 3,714 m mountain of the Pennine Alps, located on the border between Switzerland and Italy. It is the highest summit lying between the valleys of Bagnes (Valais) and Valpelline (Aosta Valley). On its northern side La Singla overlooks the Otemma Glacier.

See also
List of mountains of Switzerland

References

External links
 La Singla on Hikr

Mountains of the Alps
Alpine three-thousanders
Mountains of Switzerland
Mountains of Italy
Italy–Switzerland border
International mountains of Europe
Mountains of Valais
Bagnes